is a main character in the manga series Saint Seiya, created by Masami Kurumada, and later adapted to anime. Hyoga is cold and calm by nature, which complements his abilities as a saint. He was the third of the five main protagonists to be introduced. In some English adaptations he was named Swan Hyoga.

Being one of the protagonists, and the Bronze Saint of Cygnus. He was trained by Crystal Saint, and with him he learned to manipulate the ice. Following his master's teachings, he tries to remain rational in the face of everything, but he has an emotional side that he can't let go of.

Creation and conception

As stated by Masami Kurumada in interviews, he was going to make Milo Cygnus Hyōga's master. He changed his mind when he realized there could be a relation between the Aquarius and Cygnus constellations, as both Saints had water-ice -based fighting styles. Kurumada indeed wrote and illustrated a few pages of his manga, in which Hyōga and Milo interacted as master and disciple, but he rewrote and redrew them after defining and establishing Aquarius Camus as Hyōga's master. The non-published pages of the manga with Milo as Hyōga's master can be found in the web and in some special publications regarding Saint Seiya.

Character outline
One of the main characters in the series, Hyoga appears calm, collected, and unemotional. Beneath the surface, however, he is passionate and devoted to his ideals. As a Saint born under the Cygnus constellation, Hyoga is able to control and manipulate ice and snow as he pleases, as he mastered the basis of the technique of the Saints of ice, stop the atoms of matter by the power of their Cosmo.

Abilities
As a Saint, Hyoga has been trained in mind and body to learn how to use the power of the Cosmos within his own body and use it for super strength, speed, agility, durability and reflexes. The constellation he uses for extra power is that of The Cygnus constellation, aka Swan' and by channeling his cosmos into the Cygnus constellation using the cloth armor it's based on' he's able to combine his cosmos with the constellation's cosmos to increase his own power which he can use for cosmic energy blasts, form and shoot ice & snow attacks, heal himself and sense other people with their own cosmos. After he and his fellow bronze saints obtained the blood of the gold saints to repair their cloths when they were damaged they acquired even more power and upgraded cloths in the process, same for god cloth after their cloths were blessed by Saori aka Athena herself using her own blood as well.

Role in the series
In the manga, Hyoga originally did not choose to participate in the Galaxian Wars until he received an order from Sanctuary to assassinate the other Bronze Saints. He originally accepted this due to his hatred for the Graude Foundation, being aware that Mitsumasa Kido was his father. As he became more familiar with his subjects, however, Hyoga grew indecisive about his mission. Once the Silver Saints began to target him along with the other Bronze Saints, however, he dropped his allegiance to Sanctuary. His rage towards Sanctuary boiled after his master Camus made an unexpected visit to Siberia to sent his mother's ship deep into the ocean's abyss. Hyoga competes with the same motivation as the other bronze saints—to win the Gold Cloth of Sagittarius.

During the battle with Phoenix Ikki, his tender side was revealed, and he slowly began to display his true personality. In the Sanctuary arc, Hyoga became extremely close to Andromeda Shun after his comrade displayed an act of selflessness in attempt to revive his cosmos from death, constantly referring to how he owed Shun his life. In the Hades arc, Hyoga paired with Dragon Shiryu as the saints of Athena waged war against the Underworld. Hyoga protects Seiya and Shun from the judge Minos during the story and later faces the gods Thanatos and Hypnos in the Elysium. Across this battles, the Cygnus Cloth becomes a stronger God Cloth and lends his Cosmos to Athena to kill Hades. A sidestory is contained in vol.13 and it is titled Koori no Kuni no Natasha Hen (Chapter of Natasha, from the Land of Ice) where Hyoga meets soldiers known as Blue Soldiers and saves a woman frozen.

Reception
Critical reception to Hyoga has been mixed. Kenshō Ono describes the character as "collected and unemotional". Jason Thompson of Anime News Network found Hyoga's fight against the Black Cygnus too violent for the demographic's standards, especially when the Black Saint removes one of his own eyes DVDTalk noted that while fans might look forward Hyoga and Shiryu's screentime in the anime, he felt the series was poorly written to the point he felt Bronze Saints' personalities change too often in the same ways as the villains. DVDVisionJapan similarly found Hyoga's first fight brutal due to how Hydra Saint punches multiple times in the face to point Hyoga's blood falls outside the arena and reaches Seiya's face. Chris Beveridge from AnimeOnDVD joked how one of the anime's episode titles, "Farewell Hyoga – Rest In Peace", spoils Hyoga's possible death in the Sanctuary arc. His fight against Camus was noted to be most interesting from the DVD reviewed as Hyoga has to clash with his two masters. Nevertheless, he found Hyoga's episodes fun to watch. Hyoga's "Diamond Dust" technique was criticized by the FandomPost for being overused in battles to the point it appears the writer suffered writer's block. Despite this in "Blood, Biceps, and Beautiful Eyes: Cultural Representations of Masculinity in Masami Kurumada's Saint Seiya", author Lorna Piatti-Farnell notes that the masculinity Seiya, Shun, Hyoga and Shiryu bow to involves accomplishments of their goals of justice might not come as a surprise as the magazine Shonen Jump often has manga that involves this predicaments. IGN praised him as one of the most charismatic main characters of the series, stating that despite his calm demeanor Hyoga carries an Oedipus complex as a result of losing his mother when he was a child.

Hyoga's role in other films and series have been the subject of discussion. In regards to the Netflix series, HobbyConsolas felt Hyoga's backstory was well written despite some issues with the narrative. While liking Legend of the Sanctuarys themes, the same site was surprised by the handling of Hyoga who appears driving a bike. In a review of Legend of Sanctuary, Screen praised the homage to Hyoga's techniques and noted the older fans glorified his battle with Camus. In Japan Hyoga is a popular character ranking at 2nd in the main character polls of the bronze saints.

References

Anime and manga characters who can move at superhuman speeds
Anime and manga characters with superhuman strength
Child characters in anime and manga
Comics characters introduced in 1986
Fictional characters with air or wind abilities
Fictional characters with dimensional travel abilities
Fictional characters with energy-manipulation abilities
Fictional characters with extrasensory perception
Fictional characters with ice or cold abilities
Fictional characters with superhuman durability or invulnerability
Fictional Christians
Fictional male martial artists
Fictional shield fighters
Fictional Soviet people
Male characters in anime and manga
Martial artist characters in anime and manga
Orphan characters in anime and manga
Saint Seiya characters
Teenage characters in anime and manga
Time travelers

pt:Hyoga de Cisne